Bedford Public Schools can refer to:
Bedford Central School District, a school district in Mount Kisco, New York
Bedford County Public Schools, a school district in Bedford County, Virginia
Bedford Public Schools (Massachusetts), a school district in Bedford, Massachusetts
Bedford Public Schools (Michigan), a school district in Bedford, Michigan
New Bedford Public Schools, a school district in New Bedford, Massachusetts